The men's 100 metres at the 1946 European Athletics Championships was held in Oslo, Norway, at Bislett Stadion on 23 August 1946.

Medalists

Results

Final
23 August

Semi-finals
23 August

Semi-final 1

Semi-final 2

Semi-final 3

Heats
23 August

Heat 1

Heat 2

Heat 3

Heat 4

Heat 5

Participation
According to an unofficial count, 24 athletes from 14 countries participated in the event.

 (2)
 (2)
 (2)
 (1)
 (2)
 (1)
 (2)
 (2)
 (2)
 (1)
 (1)
 (2)
 (2)
 (2)

References

100 metres
100 metres at the European Athletics Championships